Nordal Church is a parish church of the Church of Norway in Kinn Municipality in Vestland county, Norway. It is located in the small village of Norddalsfjord, and it serves the northeastern part of the municipality. It is the church for the Nordal parish which is part of the Sunnfjord prosti (deanery) in the Diocese of Bjørgvin. The white, wooden church was built in a long church design in 1898 using plans drawn up by the architect Jacob Wilhelm Nordan. The church seats about 200 people.

History
The people of Norddalsfjorden had belonged to the parish of Bru for a long time, which meant they had an extremely long and strenuous way to get to church which was located on the island of Svanøya. They had to go all the way to the Svanøy Church, not only for ordinary worship services, but also for baptism ceremonies, weddings, and funerals.

A new cemetery was consecrated in the Norddalsfjorden area on 17 November 1869. This helped the local residents, but not long after this, they began to desire their own church. In 1887, the local residents formally requested their own church, and two years after that, the decision was made to get started on the project. Fundraising began in 1889. The people in the valley had raised , and the same sum was allocated by the Norwegian Parliament and the municipality of Kinn. The building was constructed in 1898 by the builder Anders Korsvold. The new church was consecrated on 14 September 1898 by the local Dean Andreas D. Jespersen.

At first, the parish vicar was somewhat reluctant to have a new church building because this implied that he would have to travel more frequently. Furthermore, when the church was completed, he tried to confine the services to the summer months, but the parish council objected. In the first years, services were held five times a year, preferably in the winter. Nowadays services are held fourteen times a year. Electric heating was installed in the building in 1964, but it was not until 1994 that electric lighting was installed in the building. On 1 January 1998, the church was separated from Bru and formed its own parish within the municipality.

Media gallery

See also
List of churches in Bjørgvin

References

Kinn
Churches in Vestland
Long churches in Norway
Wooden churches in Norway
19th-century Church of Norway church buildings
Churches completed in 1898
1898 establishments in Norway